A cognitive model is an approximation of one or more cognitive processes in humans or other animals for the purposes of comprehension and prediction. There are many types of cognitive models, and they can range from box-and-arrow diagrams to a set of equations to software programs that interact with the same tools that humans use to complete tasks (e.g., computer mouse and keyboard).

Relationship to cognitive architectures
Cognitive models can be developed within or without a cognitive architecture, though the two are not always easily distinguishable. In contrast to cognitive architectures, cognitive models tend to be focused on a single cognitive phenomenon or process (e.g., list learning), how two or more processes interact (e.g., visual search bsc1780 decision making), or making behavioral predictions for a specific task or tool (e.g., how instituting a new software package will affect productivity). Cognitive architectures tend to be focused on the structural properties of the modeled system, and help constrain the development of cognitive models within the architecture. Likewise, model development helps to inform limitations and shortcomings of the architecture. Some of the most popular architectures for cognitive modeling include ACT-R, Clarion, LIDA, and Soar.

History
Cognitive modeling historically developed within cognitive psychology/cognitive science (including human factors), and has received contributions from the fields of machine learning and artificial intelligence among others.

Box-and-arrow models
A number of key terms are used to describe the processes involved in the perception, storage, and production of speech. Typically, they are used by speech pathologists while treating a child patient. The input signal is the speech signal heard by the child, usually assumed to come from an adult speaker. The output signal is the utterance produced by the child. The unseen psychological events that occur between the arrival of an input signal and the production of speech are the focus of psycholinguistic models. Events that process the input signal are referred to as input processes, whereas events that process the production of speech are referred to as output processes. Some aspects of speech processing are thought to happen online—that is, they occur during the actual perception
or production of speech and thus require a share of the attentional resources dedicated to the speech task. Other processes, thought to happen offline, take place as part of the child's background mental processing rather than during the time dedicated to the speech task.
In this sense, online processing is sometimes defined as occurring in real-time, whereas offline processing is said to be time-free (Hewlett, 1990). In box-and-arrow psycholinguistic models, each hypothesized level of representation or processing can be represented in a diagram by a “box,” and the relationships between them by “arrows,” hence the name. Sometimes (as in the models of Smith, 1973, and Menn, 1978, described later in this paper) the arrows represent processes additional to those shown in boxes. Such models make explicit the hypothesized information-
processing activities carried out in a particular cognitive function (such as language), in a manner analogous to computer flowcharts that depict the processes and decisions carried out by a computer program. Box-and-arrow models differ widely in the number of unseen psychological processes they describe and thus in the number of boxes they contain. Some have only one or two boxes between the input and output signals (e.g., Menn, 1978; Smith, 1973), whereas others have multiple boxes representing complex relationships between a number of different information-processing events (e.g., Hewlett, 1990; Hewlett, Gibbon, & Cohen- McKenzie, 1998; Stackhouse & Wells, 1997). The most important box, however, and the source of much ongoing debate, is that representing the underlying representation (or UR). In essence, an underlying representation captures information stored in a child's mind about a word he or she knows and uses. As the following description of several models will illustrate, the nature of this information and thus the type(s) of representation present in the child's knowledge base have captured the attention of researchers for some time. (Elise Baker et al. Psycholinguistic Models of Speech Development and Their Application to Clinical Practice. Journal of Speech, Language, and Hearing Research. June 2001. 44. p 685–702.)

Computational models

A computational model is a mathematical model in computational science that requires extensive computational resources to study the behavior of a complex system by computer simulation. The system under study is often a complex nonlinear system for which simple, intuitive analytical solutions are not readily available. Rather than deriving a mathematical analytical solution to the problem, experimentation with the model is done by changing the parameters of the system in the computer, and studying the differences in the outcome of the experiments. Theories of operation of the model can be derived/deduced from these computational experiments.
Examples of common computational models are weather forecasting models, earth simulator models, flight simulator models, molecular protein folding models, and neural network models.

Symbolic
A symbolic model is expressed in characters, usually non-numeric ones, that require translation before they can be used.

Subsymbolic
A cognitive model is subsymbolic if it is made by constituent entities that are not representations in their turn, e.g., pixels, sound images as perceived by the ear, signal samples; subsymbolic units in neural networks can be considered particular cases of this category.

Hybrid
Hybrid computers are computers that exhibit features of analog computers and digital computers. The digital component normally serves as the controller and provides logical operations, while the analog component normally serves as a solver of differential equations. See more details at hybrid intelligent system.

Dynamical systems
In the traditional computational approach, representations are viewed as static structures of discrete symbols. Cognition takes place by transforming static symbol structures in discrete, sequential steps. Sensory information is transformed into symbolic inputs, which produce symbolic outputs that get transformed into motor outputs. The entire system operates in an ongoing cycle.

What is missing from this traditional view is that human cognition happens continuously and in real time. Breaking down the processes into discrete time steps may not fully capture this behavior. An alternative approach is to define a system with (1) a state of the system at any given time, (2) a behavior, defined as the change over time in overall state, and (3) a state set or state space, representing the totality of overall states the system could be in. The system is distinguished by the fact that a change in any aspect of the system state depends on other aspects of the same or other system states.

A typical dynamical model is formalized by several differential equations that describe how the system's state changes over time.  By doing so, the form of the space of possible trajectories and the internal and external forces that shape a specific trajectory that unfold over time, instead of the physical nature of the underlying mechanisms that manifest this dynamics, carry explanatory force. On this dynamical view, parametric inputs alter the system's intrinsic dynamics, rather than specifying an internal state that describes some external state of affairs.

Early dynamical systems

Associative memory
Early work in the application of dynamical systems to cognition can be found in the model of Hopfield networks. These networks were proposed as a model for associative memory. They represent the neural level of memory, modeling systems of around 30 neurons which can be in either an on or off state.  By letting the network learn on its own, structure and computational properties naturally arise. Unlike previous models, “memories” can be formed and recalled by inputting a small portion of the entire memory. Time ordering of memories can also be encoded. The behavior of the system is modeled with vectors which can change values, representing different states of the system. This early model was a major step toward a dynamical systems view of human cognition, though many details had yet to be added and more phenomena accounted for.

Language acquisition
By taking into account the evolutionary development of the human nervous system and the similarity of the brain to other organs, Elman proposed that language and cognition should be treated as a dynamical system rather than a digital symbol processor.  Neural networks of the type Elman implemented have come to be known as Elman networks.  Instead of treating language as a collection of static lexical items and grammar rules that are learned and then used according to fixed rules, the dynamical systems view defines the lexicon as regions of state space within a dynamical system. Grammar is made up of attractors and repellers that constrain movement in the state space. This means that representations are sensitive to context, with mental representations viewed as trajectories through mental space instead of objects that are constructed and remain static. Elman networks were trained with simple sentences to represent grammar as a dynamical system. Once a basic grammar had been learned, the networks could then parse complex sentences by predicting which words would appear next according to the dynamical model.

Cognitive development
A classic developmental error has been investigated in the context of dynamical systems: The A-not-B error is proposed to be not a distinct error occurring at a specific age (8 to 10 months), but a feature of a dynamic learning process that is also present in older children. Children 2 years old were found to make an error similar to the A-not-B error when searching for toys hidden in a sandbox. After observing the toy being hidden in location A and repeatedly searching for it there, the 2-year-olds were shown a toy hidden in a new location B. When they looked for the toy, they searched in locations that were biased toward location A. This suggests that there is an ongoing representation of the toy's location that changes over time. The child's past behavior influences its model of locations of the sandbox, and so an account of behavior and learning must take into account how the system of the sandbox and the child's past actions is changing over time.

Locomotion
One proposed mechanism of a dynamical system comes from analysis of continuous-time recurrent neural networks (CTRNNs).  By focusing on the output of the neural networks rather than their states and examining fully interconnected networks, three-neuron central pattern generator (CPG) can be used to represent systems such as leg movements during walking. This CPG contains three motor neurons to control the foot, backward swing, and forward swing effectors of the leg. Outputs of the network represent whether the foot is up or down and how much force is being applied to generate torque in the leg joint. One feature of this pattern is that neuron outputs are either off or on most of the time. Another feature is that the states are quasi-stable, meaning that they will eventually transition to other states. A simple pattern generator circuit like this is proposed to be a building block for a dynamical system. Sets of neurons that simultaneously transition from one quasi-stable state to another are defined as a dynamic module. These modules can in theory be combined to create larger circuits that comprise a complete dynamical system. However, the details of how this combination could occur are not fully worked out.

Modern dynamical systems

Behavioral dynamics
Modern formalizations of dynamical systems applied to the study of cognition vary. One such formalization, referred to as “behavioral dynamics”, treats the agent and the environment as a pair of coupled dynamical systems based on classical dynamical systems theory.  In this formalization, the information from the environment informs the agent's behavior and the agent's actions modify the environment. In the specific case of perception-action cycles, the coupling of the environment and the agent is formalized by two functions.  The first transforms the representation of the agents action into specific patterns of muscle activation that in turn produce forces in the environment.  The second function transforms the information from the environment (i.e., patterns of stimulation at the agent's receptors that reflect the environment's current state) into a representation that is useful for controlling the agents actions.  Other similar dynamical systems have been proposed (although not developed into a formal framework) in which the agent's nervous systems, the agent's body, and the environment are coupled together

Adaptive behaviors
Behavioral dynamics have been applied to locomotive behavior.  Modeling locomotion with behavioral dynamics demonstrates that adaptive behaviors could arise from the interactions of an agent and the environment.  According to this framework, adaptive behaviors can be captured by two levels of analysis.  At the first level of perception and action, an agent and an environment can be conceptualized as a pair of dynamical systems coupled together by the forces the agent applies to the environment and by the structured information provided by the environment.  Thus, behavioral dynamics emerge from the agent-environment interaction.  At the second level of time evolution,  behavior can be expressed as a dynamical system represented as a vector field. In this vector field, attractors reflect stable behavioral solutions, where as bifurcations reflect changes in behavior.  In contrast to previous work on central pattern generators, this framework suggests that stable behavioral patterns are an emergent, self-organizing property of the agent-environment system rather than determined by the structure of either the agent or the environment.

Open dynamical systems
In an extension of classical dynamical systems theory, rather than coupling the environment's and the agent's dynamical systems to each other, an “open dynamical system” defines a “total system”, an “agent system”, and a mechanism to relate these two systems.  The total system is a dynamical system that models an agent in an environment, whereas the agent system is a dynamical system that models an agent's intrinsic dynamics (i.e., the agent's dynamics in the absence of an environment).  Importantly, the relation mechanism does not couple the two systems together, but rather continuously modifies the total system into the decoupled agent's total system. By distinguishing between total and agent systems, it is possible to investigate an agent's behavior when it is isolated from the environment and when it is embedded within an environment.  This formalization can be seen as a generalization from the classical formalization, whereby the agent system can be viewed as the agent system in an open dynamical system, and the agent coupled to the environment and the environment can be viewed as the total system in an open dynamical system.

Embodied cognition
In the context of dynamical systems and embodied cognition, representations can be conceptualized as indicators or mediators.  In the indicator view, internal states carry information about the existence of an object in the environment, where the state of a system during exposure to an object is the representation of that object.  In the mediator view, internal states carry information about the environment which is used by the system in obtaining its goals. In this more complex account, the states of the system carries information that mediates between the information the agent takes in from the environment, and the force exerted on the environment by the agents behavior.  The application of open dynamical systems have been discussed for four types of classical embodied cognition examples:   
 Instances where the environment and agent must work together to achieve a goal, referred to as "intimacy". A classic example of intimacy is the behavior of simple agents working to achieve a goal (e.g., insects traversing the environment).  The successful completion of the goal relies fully on the coupling of the agent to the environment.
 Instances where the use of external artifacts improves the performance of tasks relative to performance without these artifacts. The process is referred to as "offloading".  A classic example of offloading is the behavior of Scrabble players; people are able to create more words when playing Scrabble if they have the tiles in front of them and are allowed to physically manipulate their arrangement.  In this example, the Scrabble tiles allow the agent to offload working memory demands on to the tiles themselves.
 Instances where a functionally equivalent external artifact replaces functions that are normally performed internally by the agent, which is a special case of offloading.  One famous example is that of human (specifically the agents Otto and Inga) navigation in a complex environment with or without assistance of an artifact.
 Instances where there is not a single agent. The individual agent is part of larger system that contains multiple agents and multiple artifacts. One famous example, formulated by Ed Hutchins in his book Cognition in the Wild, is that of navigating a naval ship.
The interpretations of these examples rely on the following logic: (1) the total system captures embodiment; (2) one or more agent systems capture the intrinsic dynamics of individual agents; (3) the complete behavior of an agent can be understood as a change to the agent's intrinsic dynamics in relation to its situation in the environment; and (4) the paths of an open dynamical system can be interpreted as representational processes.  These embodied cognition examples show the importance of studying the emergent dynamics of an agent-environment systems, as well as the intrinsic dynamics of agent systems.  Rather than being at odds with traditional cognitive science approaches, dynamical systems are a natural extension of these methods and should be studied in parallel rather than in competition.

See also 
 Computational cognition
 Computational models of language acquisition
 Computational-representational understanding of mind
 MindModeling@Home
 Memory-prediction framework
 Space mapping

References

External links

 Cognitive modeling at CMU
 Cognitive modeling at RPI (HCI)
 Cognitive modeling at RPI (CLARION)
 Cognitive modeling at the University of Memphis (LIDA)
 Cognitive modeling at UMich

 
Enactive cognition